Eurychone rothschildiana is a species of flowering plants in the family Orchidaceae. It is the larger of the two species in the genus Eurychone, with a range extending from Liberia to Uganda, including Nigeria, Ghana, Gabon, Congo-Kinshasa, etc. Its growth habit is monopodial, similar to those species in the genus Phalaenopsis. The flowers are born on short raceme and the flowers themselves are 6 cm across with a very broad lip. The flowers are white with the lip exhibiting a white frilled border with a large green blotch followed by either a brown or purple throat. There is also a 1.5 cm spur attached to the flower.

References

External links

Angraecinae
Orchids of Africa
Plants described in 1903